Improvement District No. 24, or Improvement District No. 24 (Wood Buffalo), is an improvement district in Alberta, Canada. Coextensive with the portion of Wood Buffalo National Park in northeast Alberta, the improvement district provides local governance for lands within the park that are not within Indian reserves.

History 
Improvement District (ID) No. 24 was originally formed as ID No. 150 on January 1, 1967. ID No. 150 was renumbered to ID No. 24 on January 1, 1969.

Geography 
Improvement District (ID) No. 24 is adjacent to the northern boundary of the province of Alberta. It borders the Northwest Territories to the north, the Regional Municipality of Wood Buffalo to the east and south, and Mackenzie County to the west. The Peace River meanders eastward through ID No. 24, which at its confluence with Riviere des Rochers becomes the Slave River. The Athabasca River, Riviere des Rochers, and the Slave River comprise much of the eastern boundary of ID No. 24. Some of its water bodies include Baril Lake, Lake Claire, and Mamawi Lake. The majority of the Peace-Athabasca Delta is within the southeast portion of ID No. 24.

Communities and localities 
No urban municipalities, hamlets, or urban service areas are within ID No. 24. A portion of the St. Bruno Farm settlement is within the northeast portion of the improvement district.

The following localities are within ID No. 24.
Localities
Big Slough
Carlson Landing
Carlsons Landing
Fifth Meridian
Garden Creek
Hay Camp
Jackfish River
Little Fishery
Pointe de Roche
Quatre Fourches
Sweetgrass Landing
Wood Buffalo National Park

First Nations have the following Indian reserves within ID No. 24.
Indian reserves
Ɂejëre Kʼelnı Kuę́ 196I
Peace Point 222
Tthebatthıe 196
Tsʼu Nedhé 196H

Demographics 

Attractions 
Alberta's portion of Wood Buffalo National Park is within Improvement District No. 24.

Government 
Improvement District No. 24 is governed by Alberta's Minister of Municipal Affairs.

See also 
List of communities in Alberta

References 

1967 establishments in Alberta
Wood Buffalo National Park

24